Eric Goldberg (1890–1969) was a Jewish-Canadian painter, born in 1890 in Berlin, Germany. No was influenced by the art of Pierre-Auguste Renoir at an early age. He studied at Paris, France's École des Beaux-Arts (1906–10) and Académie Julian under Tony Robert-Fleury, Jules Joseph Lefebvre and Jean-Paul Laurens, and taught at the Prussian Academy of Arts and, later, the Bezalel School of Arts and Crafts, Jerusalem (1911–1915, returning to teach again in then British Mandate of Palestine from 1924 to 1926). He began working in Montreal in 1928, and soon after began favouring the landscapes of Quebec's Gaspésie region as subjects. In 1939, Goldberg became a founding member of the Contemporary Arts Society (in French, Société d'art contemporain), a group of Canadian artists intent on sensitizing the public to modern art.

His work has been exhibited in Europe, Asia, and North America. He married Quebec-born Regina Seiden (1897) - a well-respected artist in her own right - who studied under the Canadian traditionalist masters William Brymner and Maurice Cullen. Goldberg was also a member of the Eastern Group of Painters, a group founded in Montreal to counter the nationalism of the Canadian Group of Painters. He was well represented by Max Stern's Dominion Gallery in Montreal.

Goldberg died in Montreal in 1969.

Selected collections
 National Gallery of Canada, ttawa
 Canadian Jewish Congress National Archives, Montreal
 Peel Art Gallery, Museum and Archives, Brampton
 Israel Museum, Jerusalem 
 Musée national des beaux-arts du Québec, Quebec
The archives at the National Gallery of Canada also has a fonds including roughly 180 of his works, separate from the main art collection.

References
 Dominion Gallery Archives, National Gallery of Canada Library & Archives

External links 
 National Gallery of Canada (Eric Goldberg)
 Canadian Jewish Congress National Archives (Eric Goldberg special collection)
 Eric Goldberg fonds at the National Gallery of Canada, Ottawa, Ontario.
 Westmount Historical Association (Eric Goldberg archive)
 

1890 births
1969 deaths
Académie Julian alumni
20th-century Canadian painters
Canadian male painters
Jewish Canadian artists
Jewish painters
Artists from Montreal
Artists from Berlin
19th-century German Jews
German emigrants to Canada
Canadian alumni of the École des Beaux-Arts
Academic staff of the Prussian Academy of Arts
20th-century Canadian male artists
Jews and Judaism in Montreal